Rudolf Wessely (19 January 1925 in Vienna, Austria – 25 April 2016 in Munich, Germany) was an Austrian actor.

Partial filmography

 Guten Tag, lieber Tag (1961) - Strebel
 Wo wir fröhlich gewesen sind (1966, TV Movie) - Lamprett Bellboys
 Tragödie auf der Jagd (1968, TV Movie) - Dr. Wosnessensky
  (1976) - Wieland
  (1976)
 Derrick (TV Series, 6 episodes):
"Der Fotograf" (1978) - Herr Beer
"Schubachs Rückkehr" (1979) - Rudolf Frank
"Hanna, liebe Hanna" (1980) - Bächler
"Die Schwester" (1981) - Der alte Lehrer / Old teacher
"Eine Falle für Derrick" (1982) - Herr Kramer
"Ein Spiel mit dem Tod" (1984) - Martin Kussloff
 The Tailor from Ulm (1978) - Pointet
  (1979, TV film) - Hans Prehl
 Sunday Children (1980)
 Die kleine Figur meines Vaters (1980) - Walter Henisch
 Lieber Karl (1984) - Kubelka
 Wahnfried (1986) - Schnappauf
 Das Diarium des Dr. Döblinger (1986)
 Kir Royal (1986, TV Series) - Sedlacek
 Follow Me (1989) - Frisör
  (1990)
 Der Nachbar (1992) - Rudolf Pawlik
 Inspector Rex (1996, Episode: "Stadt in Angst") - Theo Kern
 Der Bulle von Tölz (1996, Episode: "Tod am Altar") - Bischof
 The Unfish (1997) - Pfarrer
 Comedian Harmonists (1997) - Herr Grunbaum
 Opernball (1998, TV Movie) - Alter Sicherheitsdirektor
 Wer liebt, dem wachsen Flügel... (1999) - Prof. Unseld
 Klemperer – Ein Leben in Deutschland (1999, Episode: "Also bleibe ich") - Prof. Abendroth
 Gripsholm (2000) - Chefredakteur / Verleger-Editor / publisher
 Die Manns – Ein Jahrhundertroman (2001, TV Mini-Series) - Alfred Pringsheim
 Tatort (2004, Episode: "Hundeleben") - Herr Kehl
 Schokolade für den Chef (2008, TV Movie) - Willi Mattusch
 Klimawechsel (2010, TV Series)
  (2010, TV Movie) - Kurt Wegener (final film role)

References

External links

1925 births
2016 deaths
Male actors from Vienna
Austrian male television actors
Austrian male film actors
20th-century Austrian male actors
21st-century Austrian male actors